Shlishkes (the plural form is standard) is  a potato-based small dumpling of Hungarian Jewish origin, and are a popular part of the Jewish cuisine of the Ashkenazi community.

Overview

It is formed from a soft dough of cooked mashed potatoes, egg, flour and water; the dumplings are boiled and rolled in sugar and hot buttered caramelized breadcrumbs (streusel) or in browned breadcrumbs as a savory preparation.

See also
Gnocchi
Matzo ball
Kreplach

References

Ashkenazi Jewish cuisine
Dumplings
Hungarian-American cuisine
Hungarian cuisine
Jews and Judaism in Hungary
Potato dishes